Kenya, participated at the 2015 All-Africa Games held in the city of Brazzaville, in the Republic of the Congo. 364 athletes participated in 17 disciplines.

Medal summary

Medal table

|  style="text-align:left; width:78%; vertical-align:top;"|

|  style="text-align:left; width:22%; vertical-align:top;"|

Athletics

Badminton

Beach volleyball

Boxing

Cycling

Handball

Judo

Karate

Swimming

Table tennis

Taekwondo

Tennis

Volleyball

References

Nations at the 2015 African Games
2015
2015 in Kenyan sport